Atyidae is a family of shrimp, present in all tropical and most temperate waters of the world. Adults of this family are almost always confined to fresh water. This is the only family in the superfamily Atyoidea.

Genera and species
The following classification follows De Grave et al. (2010), with subsequent additions.

Antecaridina Edmondson, 1954
Archaeatya Villalobos, 1959
Atya Leach, 1816
Atyaephyra de Brito Capello, 1867
Atydina Cai, 2010
Atyella Calman, 1906
Atyoida Randall, 1840
Atyopsis Chace, 1983
Australatya Chace, 1983
Caridella Calman, 1906
Caridina H. Milne-Edwards, 1837
Caridinides Calman, 1926
Caridinopsis Bouvier, 1912
Delclosia Rabadà, 1993 †
Dugastella Bouvier, 1912
Edoneus Holthuis, 1978
Elephantis Castelin, Marquet & Klotz, 2013
Gallocaris Sket & Zakšek, 2009
Halocaridina Holthuis, 1963
Halocaridinides Fujino & Shokita, 1975
Jolivetya Cals, 1986
Jonga Hart, 1961
Lancaris Cai & Bahir, 2005
Limnocaridella Bouvier, 1913
Limnocaridina Calman, 1899
Mancicaris Liang, Z. L. Guo & Tang, 1999
Marosina Cai & Ng, 2005
Micratya Bouvier, 1913
Monsamnis Richard, De Grave & Clark, 2012
Neocaridina Kubo, 1938
Palaemonias Hay, 1902
Paracaridina Liang, Z. L. Guo & Tang, 1999
Paratya Miers, 1882
Parisia Holthuis, 1956
Potimirim Holthuis, 1954
Puteonator Gurney, 1987
Pycneus Holthuis, 1986
Pycnisia Bruce, 1992
Sinodina Liang & Cai, 1999
Stygiocaris Holthuis, 1960
Syncaris Holmes, 1900
Troglocaris Dormitzer, 1853
Typhlatya Creaser, 1936
Typhlocaridina Liang & Yan, 1981
Typhlopatsa Holthuis, 1956

References

External links

 
Caridea
Taxa named by Wilhem de Haan
Decapod families